The PAN Parks Foundation was a non-governmental organisation that aimed to protect Europe's wildernesses. The foundation filed for bankruptcy in May 2014 in The Netherlands, but was denied the status by the court and is currently in liquidation.

Details
The PAN Parks Foundation was founded in 1998 by the World Wide Fund for Nature and the Dutch travel company Molecaten, with the aim of creating national parks in Europe, along the model of the Yellowstone and Yosemite National Parks in North America. The organisation aims to create a network of European wilderness areas where wilderness and high quality tourism facilities are balanced with environmental protection and sustainable local development. It attempts to achieve this through a process of auditing and verification, enabling it to certify parks owned by partners as meeting particular standards, combined with political advocacy on the local and European level.

List of PAN Certified parks
 Central Balkan National Park, Bulgaria
 Fulufjället National Park, Sweden
 Majella National Park, Italy
 Oulanka National Park, Finland
 Paanajärvi National Park, Russia
 Retezat National Park, Romania
 Rila National Park, Bulgaria
 Borjomi-Kharagauli National Park, Georgia
 Southwestern Archipelago National Park, Finland
 Peneda-Gerês National Park, Portugal
 Soomaa National Park, Estonia
 Dzūkija National Park, Lithuania
 Čepkēliai Reserve, Lithuania
 Küre Mountains National Park, Turkey

References

Environmental organizations based in Europe
Protected areas of Europe
Wilderness